The Annual Review of Astronomy and Astrophysics is an annual peer reviewed scientific journal published by Annual Reviews. The co-editors are Ewine van Dishoeck and Robert C. Kennicutt. The journal reviews scientific literature pertaining to local and distant celestial entities throughout the observable universe, as well as cosmology, instrumentation, techniques, and the history of developments. It was established in 1963.

History
In November of 1960, the board of directors of the nonprofit publisher Annual Reviews began investigating the need for a new journal of review articles that covered developments in astronomy and astrophysics. The board consulted an advisory group of experts, including Ronald Bracewell, Robert Jastrow, Joseph Kaplan, Paul Merrill, Otto Struve, and Harold Urey. The editorial committee met in August 1961 to determine the authors and topics for the first volume, which was published in 1963. As of 2020, it was published both in print and electronically.

It defines its scope as covering significant developments in astronomy and astrophysics, including the Sun, the Solar System, exoplanets, stars, the interstellar medium, the Milky Way and other galaxies, galactic nuclei, cosmology, and the instrumentation and techniques used for research and analysis. As of 2022, Journal Citation Reports gives the journal an impact factor of 37.226, ranking it first out of 69 journals in the category "Astronomy and Astrophysics". It is abstracted and indexed in Scopus, Science Citation Index Expanded, Civil Engineering Abstracts, Inspec, and Academic Search, among others.

Editorial processes
The Annual Review of Astronomy and Astrophysics is led by the editor or co-editors. They are is assisted by the editorial committee, which includes associate editors, regular members, and occasionally guest editors. Guest members participate at the invitation of the editor, and serve terms of one year. All other members of the editorial committee are appointed by the Annual Reviews board of directors and serve five-year terms. The editorial committee determines which topics should be included in each volume and solicits reviews from qualified authors. Unsolicited manuscripts are not accepted. Peer review of accepted manuscripts is undertaken by the editorial committee.

Editors of volumes
Dates indicate publication years in which someone was credited as a lead editor or co-editor of a journal volume. The planning process for a volume begins well before the volume appears, so appointment to the position of lead editor generally occurred prior to the first year shown here. An editor who has retired or died may be credited as a lead editor of a volume that they helped to plan, even if it is published after their retirement or death. 

 Leo Goldberg (1963–1973)
 Geoffrey Burbidge (1974–2004)
 Roger Blandford (2005–2011)
 Ewine van Dishoeck and Sandra Faber (2012–2021)
 Ewine van Dishoeck and Robert C. Kennicutt (present)

Current editorial committee
As of 2022, the editorial committee consists of the co-editors and the following members:

 Conny Aerts
 Joss Bland-Hawthorn
 Xiaohui Fan
 Jonathan J. Fortney
 Eve C. Ostriker
 Eliot Quataert

See also
 List of astronomy journals

References 

 

Astronomy and Astrophysics
Annual journals
Astronomy journals
Astrophysics journals
Publications established in 1963
English-language journals
Physics review journals